The Paramount Knitting Company Mill is located in Beaver Dam, Wisconsin.

History
Receiving its power from the Beaver Dam River, the mill was used for cotton knitting until 1906, when it began knitting hosiery. It was later converted in to a plant for a shoe company.

It was added to the State Register of Historic Places in 2010 and to the National Register of Historic Places the following year.The textile mile was converted to knit hosiery, until 1934.

References

Industrial buildings and structures on the National Register of Historic Places in Wisconsin
National Register of Historic Places in Dodge County, Wisconsin
Cotton mills in the United States
Late 19th and Early 20th Century American Movements architecture
Brick buildings and structures
Industrial buildings completed in 1883
Beaver Dam, Wisconsin
Dams in Wisconsin
Textile mills in Wisconsin
1883 establishments in Wisconsin